Eskihisar is a village in the Merkezefendi district of Denizli Province, Turkey. The population of the village was 2,063 in the year 2000. The village is 5 kilometers from the city of Denizli.

Near the village are the ruins of the ancient city of Laodicea, one of the Seven Churches of Revelation. The name eski hisar means "old fortress" in Turkish.

References

External links

Villages in Denizli Province
Merkezefendi District